Micromonospora inyonensis is an endophytic actinomycete.

References

Further reading

External links

LPSN
Type strain of Micromonospora inyonensis at BacDive -  the Bacterial Diversity Metadatabase

Micromonosporaceae
Bacteria described in 2005